Mid Bedfordshire was a non-metropolitan district in Bedfordshire, England. It was abolished on 1 April 2009 and replaced by Central Bedfordshire.

Political control
Political control of the council was held by the following parties:

Leadership
The last leader of the council was Tricia Turner, a Conservative. She went on to be the first leader of Central Bedfordshire Council.

Council elections
1973 Mid Bedfordshire District Council election
1976 Mid Bedfordshire District Council election
1979 Mid Bedfordshire District Council election (New ward boundaries)
1983 Mid Bedfordshire District Council election
1987 Mid Bedfordshire District Council election (District boundary changes took place but the number of seats remained the same)
1991 Mid Bedfordshire District Council election (District boundary changes took place but the number of seats remained the same)
1995 Mid Bedfordshire District Council election
1999 Mid Bedfordshire District Council election
2003 Mid Bedfordshire District Council election (New ward boundaries)
2007 Mid Bedfordshire District Council election

By-election results

1995-1999

1999-2003

2003-2007

2007-2011

References

 
Council elections in Bedfordshire
District council elections in England